An election to South Dublin County Council took place on 5 June 2009 as part of that year's Irish local elections. 26 councillors were elected from five electoral divisions using the Single transferable vote system for a five-year term of office.

Results by party

Results by Electoral Area

Clondalkin

Lucan

Rathfarnam

Tallaght Central

Tallaght South

External links
 Official website

2009 Irish local elections
2009